is a Japanese light novel series written by Hirukuma and illustrated by Itsuwa Kato. The series was originally published in 2016 as a web novel by the author on the user-generated novel publishing website Shōsetsuka ni Narō. Later on the same year, it was acquired and then published by Kadokawa Shoten. A manga adaptation by Kunieda began serialization ASCII Media Works's shōnen manga magazine Dengeki Daioh in August 2021. Both the light novel and manga have been licensed in English by Yen Press. An anime television series adaptation by Studio Gokumi and AXsiZ will premiere in July 2023.

The light novels follow its titular protagonist who, after being crushed to death by a vending machine, is reincarnated as a sentient vending machine in a fantasy dungeon world. Shortly after, he meets and befriends Lammis, a young female hunter, who names him "Boxxo" and starts carrying him around on her back, and the two start their adventures in the dungeon together. Reborn as a Vending Machine has received positive reception from reviewers, with particular praise being directed at the novels' unique take on the isekai genre.

Synopsis
The then-unnamed protagonist, a Japanese vending machine otaku, is crushed to death by a falling vending machine. He then finds himself reincarnated in a fantasy world dungeon as a sentient vending machine. He can see and hear but is immobile, with his speech being limited to stock Japanese vending machine phrases, such as "Welcome" or "Too bad". As a vending machine, he discovers he can dispense any item he has bought in his previous life, and can convert such sales to points thus sustaining his existence. He is also able to use excess coins to add additional features to his vending machine body, and is able to choose which items he stocks or the prices of the items. He is also able to use some magical abilities, including a defensive force field.

Stuck in the middle of the wilderness, he encounters Lammis, a young, busty hunter girl. Lammis has a skill known as the Blessing of Might which makes her ridiculously strong, but is still a novice at managing her own strength. The two quickly become friends after he dispenses some food items to the hungry Lammis. Calling him "Boxxo" (the protagonist's real name is never revealed), she starts carrying him around on her back, which allows Boxxo to move, with his weight allowing her to more easily control her strength. The light novels chronicles their adventures as they start exploring the world's dungeon, and the characters they meet on the way.

Background
In the afterword of the first volume, Hirukuma describes his envisioning and road to publishing Reborn as a Vending Machine. He at first helped out with his father's independent business, though, after the death of his father from a high fall, he closed down the business and began pursuing his ambition as a writer. He described his father's death as giving him acrophobia, and recalled thinking "I don't know when I'm going to die like my father did. One question went through my mind: Have I done everything I've wanted to in life?" On a site titled Let's Become Novelists, a site for submitting novels, he submitted several works of fiction including another isekai piece and a battle-themed novel set in the near future, but was initially unsuccessful.

He described Reborn as a Vending Machine as his final effort after four years of unsuccessfully getting his novels published. Hirukuma wrote that "[it was] one that was fantastical and original, and one that I wanted to write [...] This wasn't a novel where I adjusted for the readers' needs, or had to think long and hard about constructing a plot. Instead, I pursued my own style for it, and it garnered the most popularity of all my work".

Characters

The titular protagonist of the light novels, Boxxo was reincarnated as a vending machine in a fantasy world after being crushed by a falling vending machine in Japan. As a vending machine, Boxxo can only communicate in stock vending machine phrases and cannot move by himself, but is able to sell and dispense items, which then rewards with him with points he can then use to upgrade himself.

Lammis is a young, energetic Hunter with the skill Blessing of Might, which makes her incredibly strong, though she is clumsy at controlling her own strength. Lammis is Boxxo's primary love interest.

A childhood friend of Lammis, who behaves more like an older sister towards her, Hulemy is a talented magical item engineer and has a tomboyish personality.

A (literal) bear who is the director of the Hunter's Association on the Clearflow Lake strata of the dungeon (where the series is primarily set).
 

A cordial, beautiful woman who runs a "business of the night" on the Clearflow Lake strata.

The daughter of a rich tycoon, Suori is selfish and strong-willed yet has taken an interest in Boxxo.

Media

Light novel
Originally Hirukuma published the series online as a web novel on the user-generated novel publishing website Shōsetsuka ni Narō in March 2016, until Kadokawa Shoten acquired the series to publish it as a light novel. 

The first volume was published by Kadokawa Shoten on August 1, 2016. Yen Press announced during the Anime Expo 2017 that they had licensed the series for an English release.

Manga
A manga adaptation illustrated by Kunieda began serialization in ASCII Media Works's shōnen manga magazine Dengeki Daioh on August 27, 2021. The manga is also licensed by Yen Press as a digital simulpublication.

Anime
In August 2022, it was announced that the series would be receiving an anime adaptation. It was later confirmed to be a television series produced by Slow Curve, animated by Studio Gokumi and AXsiZ and directed by Noriaki Akitaya, with Tatsuya Takahashi overseeing series scripts, Takahiro Sakai adapting Yūki Hagure's designs for animation. The series is set to premiere in July 2023 on Tokyo MX and other networks. Crunchyroll licensed the series outside of Asia.

Reception
Reborn as a Vending Machine, I Now Wander the Dungeon has received positive reception. Theron Martin of Anime News Network reviewed the first volume positively, praising its unique take on the isekai genre, Hirukuma's writing style, and the relationship between Boxxo and Lammis, which he found to be impressive and not having to "resort to hackneyed gimmicks". Summarising that "this novel's bizarre concept is what will catch people's attention, but the writing is good enough to keep it", some criticism was directed at the light novel's fanservice, which Martin found to be forced, and the RPG elements typical of isekai series. Similarly, Robert Frazer of UK Anime Network found Reborn as a Vending Machine to be "a blast of fresh air to flush out the stale isekai genre", as "it’s fun and different to defeat the villain with Diet Coke and Mentos instead of just firing a Saiyan blast at a higher powerlevel".

Rebecca Silverman and Lynzee Loveridge, in Anime News Network's Spring 2018 Light Novel Guide, also praised the setting but found the writing to "read like fan-fiction-level quality". They ultimately found the volume to "still [be] an engaging read", and compared it to So I'm a Spider, So What? and That Time I Got Reincarnated as a Slime. Loveridge further included the protagonist's "Death By Vending Machine" on her list of the "7 Strangest Isekai Deaths".

See also
 Is It Wrong to Try to Pick Up Girls in a Dungeon?, the manga adaptation of which is also illustrated by Kunieda

References

External links
  at Shōsetsuka ni Narō 
  
  
 

2016 Japanese novels
Anime and manga based on light novels
ASCII Media Works manga
AXsiZ
Crunchyroll anime
Dengeki Daioh
Fiction about reincarnation
Isekai anime and manga
Isekai novels and light novels
Kadokawa Dwango franchises
Kadokawa Sneaker Bunko
Light novels
Light novels first published online
Shōnen manga
Shōsetsuka ni Narō
Studio Gokumi
Vending machines
Yen Press titles